Leptopelis crystallinoron is a species of frog in the family Arthroleptidae. It is endemic to Gabon and only known from the area its type locality near the Barrage de Tchimbélé in the central Monts de Cristal (Crystal Mountains). Only one specimen was known until five specimens were captured in the Crystal Mountains National Park in 2009. It is probable that this species is endemic to the Monts de Cristal and that its range extends into Equatorial Guinea.

Description
The body is robust. The snout is truncate in dorsal view and rounded laterally. No tympanum is present. Skin is granular throughout. All fingers and toes bear discs, have lateral fringes, and are webbed (toes have more webbing than fingers). Colouration is brilliantly green dorsally and creamy white ventrally. There are few diffused tan–dark brown markings on the back, outer extremities, and around the cloacal region. The outer parts of the limbs are whitish. The flanks have white spots in the lower parts. The iris is bronze and has a black ring around it.

Habitat and conservation

The type locality falls within the Crystal Mountains National Park. There are no known threats to this species. Two of the five specimens captured in 2009 tested positive for the fungus Batrachochytrium dendrobatidis, the pathogen causing chytridiomycosis.

References

crystallinoron
Frogs of Africa
Amphibians of Gabon
Endemic fauna of Gabon
Amphibians described in 2005
Taxonomy articles created by Polbot